CSUS may refer to:

 Notation used for a suspended chord
 CSU Sibiu, a Transylvanian basketball team
 California State University System, a system of universities in California, including:
 California State University, Sacramento
 California State University, Sonoma
 California State University, Stanislaus